Martina Fortkord (born 22 March 1973) is a former Swedish alpine skier who competed in the 1998 Winter Olympics.

Her brother is Olympian Fredrik Fortkord.

External links
 sports-reference.com
 

1973 births
Living people
Swedish female alpine skiers
Olympic alpine skiers of Sweden
Alpine skiers at the 1998 Winter Olympics
20th-century Swedish women